The 1974 European Wrestling Championships  was held from 21  to 29 June 1974 in Madrid, Spain.

Medal table

Medal summary

Men's freestyle

Men's Greco-Roman

References

External links
Fila's official championship website

Europe
W
European Wrestling Championships
Sports competitions in Madrid
1974 in European sport
International wrestling competitions hosted by Spain